Russia Beyond (formerly Russia Beyond The Headlines) is a Russian multilingual project operated by TV-Novosti (formerly Russia Today), founded by the Russian state news agency RIA Novosti.

History 
Russia Beyond The Headlines was launched in 2007 by the Rossiyskaya Gazeta, a newspaper published by the Government of Russia. The first publisher of the project was the deputy CEO of Rossiyskaya Gazeta Eugene Abov.

On January 9, 2016, RBTH became part of TV-Novosti whilst retaining its own distinct brand.

In 2017 the project dropped all printed versions.

On 5 September 2017, RBTH dropped the last two words of its full name, becoming Russia Beyond.
Russia Beyond is managed by a section of the news agency TV-Novosti.

Reception 
The Guardian commentator Roy Greenslade, in 2014, and former Slate journalist Jack Shafer, in 2007, accused Russia Beyond of being propaganda.

In Europe, the media outlet paid London's Daily Telegraph, Le Figaro in France, Süddeutsche Zeitung in Germany and the Italian daily La Repubblica to be distributed as an insert to those publications, and in the United States it partnered with The Washington Post until 2015; The Wall Street Journal and The New York Times were bundling the insert into their regular editions as of 2018. Beyond the Headlines paid the Daily Telegraph £40,000 per month to be distributed as a supplement to its weekend publication and the Daily Telegraph website also featured content from RBTH's website. The monthly Russia-themed supplement first appeared in The Daily Telegraph and the American Washington Post in 2007 under the name Russia Now.

See also 

 Media of Russia

References 

Newspapers published in Russia
Companies based in Moscow
Publications established in 2007
Multilingual websites
Russian news websites